A by-election was held in the federal riding of Nanaimo—Ladysmith on May 6, 2019, following the resignation of incumbent New Democratic MP Sheila Malcolmson.

Green candidate Paul Manly won the by-election, becoming the second Green Party member to be elected to the House of Commons.

Results

See also 
 By-elections to the 42nd Canadian Parliament

References 

2019 elections in Canada
Nanaimo-Ladysmith_federal_by-election
Federal by-elections in British Columbia
Politics of Nanaimo
May 2019 events in Canada